George Ellery Hale (June 29, 1868 – February 21, 1938) was an American astrophysicist, best known for his discovery of magnetic fields in sunspots, and as the leader or key figure in the planning or  construction of several world-leading telescopes; namely, the 40-inch refracting telescope at Yerkes Observatory, 60-inch Hale reflecting telescope at Mount Wilson Observatory, 100-inch Hooker reflecting telescope at Mount Wilson, and the 200-inch Hale reflecting telescope at Palomar Observatory.  He played a key role in the foundation of the International Union for Cooperation in Solar Research and the National Research Council, and in developing the California Institute of Technology into a leading research university.

Early life and education
George Ellery Hale was born on June 29, 1868, in Chicago, Illinois, to William Ellery Hale and Mary Browne. He is descended from Thomas Hale of Watton-on-Stone, Hertfordshire, England, whose son emigrated to America about 1640. His father acquired a considerable fortune manufacturing and installing passenger elevators during the reconstruction of Chicago, which had been destroyed in the Great Chicago Fire of 1871. The oldest of three children who lived past childhood, George received strong encouragement from his father, who supported the boy's active mind and curiosity, and his mother, who inculcated in him a love of poetry and literature. 

He spent his youth fascinated by the books and machinery given to him by his parents—one of his most prized possessions was a small microscope. With his father's encouragement, he built a small shop in their house that turned into a laboratory. The microscope led to his interest in optics. At the age of fourteen, George built his first telescope. His father later replaced it with a second-hand Clark refractor that they mounted on the roof of their Kenwood house. Soon he was photographing the night skies, observing a partial eclipse of the sun, and drawing sun-spots.

As an avid reader with a strong interest in the budding field of astrophysics, Hale was drawn to the writings of William Huggins, Norman Lockyer, and Ernest Rutherford. His fascination with science, however, did not preclude interests more typical of a normal boy, such as fishing, boating, swimming, skating, tennis, and bicycling. He was an enthusiastic reader of the stories of Jules Verne—particularly drawn to the tales of adventure set in the mountains of California. Hale spent summers at his grandmother's house in the old New England village of Madison, Connecticut, where he met his future wife, Evelina Conklin. 

After graduating from Oakland Public School in Chicago, Hale attended the Allen Academy, where he studied chemistry, physics, and astronomy. He supplemented his practical home experience by attending a course in shop-work at the Chicago Manual Training School. During these years, Hale developed a knowledge of the principles of architecture and city planning with the help of his father's friend, well-known architect Daniel Burnham. Upon Burnham's advice and encouragement, Hale decided at the age of seventeen to continue his education at the Massachusetts Institute of Technology (MIT).

Hale was educated at MIT, at the Harvard College Observatory, (1889–90), and in Berlin (1893–94) where he was a PhD student but never finished his degree.  At the time he already had an appointment as a professor at the recently established University of Chicago.  As an undergraduate at MIT, he is known for inventing the spectroheliograph,  with which he made his discovery of solar vortices.

Research 

In 1890, he began research at the Kenwood Astrophysical Observatory, which Hale's father had built for him; he was professor of astrophysics at Beloit College (1891–93); associate professor at the University of Chicago until 1897, and full professor (1897–1905).    He was coeditor of Astronomy and Astrophysics, 1892–95, and after 1895 editor of the Astrophysical Journal.  He also served on the board of trustees for Science Service, now known as Society for Science & the Public, from 1921 to 1923.

In 1908, he used the Zeeman effect with a modified spectroheliograph to establish that sunspots were magnetic.  Subsequent work demonstrated a strong tendency for east-west alignment of magnetic polarities in sunspots, with mirror symmetry across the solar equator; and that the polarity in each hemisphere switched orientation from one sunspot cycle to the next. This systematic property of sunspot magnetic fields is now commonly referred to as the "Hale–Nicholson law," or in many cases simply "Hale's law."  

Hale spent a large portion of his career trying to find a way to image the solar corona without the benefit of a total solar eclipse, but this was not achieved until the work of Bernard Lyot.
In October 1913, Hale received a letter from Albert Einstein, asking whether certain astronomical observations could be done that would test Einstein's hypothesis concerning the effects of gravity on light.  Hale replied in November, saying that such observations could be done only during a total eclipse of the sun.

Founding and organizing of institutions 
Hale was a driven individual, who worked to found a number of significant astronomical observatories, including Yerkes Observatory, Mount Wilson Observatory, Palomar Observatory, and the Hale Solar Laboratory.  At Mount Wilson, he hired and encouraged Harlow Shapley and Edwin Hubble toward some of the most significant discoveries of the time.  He was a prolific organizer who helped create a number of astronomical institutions, societies and journals.  Hale also played a central role in developing the California Institute of Technology into a leading research university. After retiring as director at Mount Wilson, he built the Hale Solar Laboratory in Pasadena, California, as his office and workshop, pursuing his interest in the sun.

From early youth, Hale had been internationally oriented, travelling widely throughout Europe in his younger years. Having long realized the value of an international organization to coordinate scientific research, he pursued, as chairman of a committee of the National Academy of Sciences of the US, the formation of an international organization for solar research. The society's inaugural meeting was held at the St. Louis Exposition of 1904 and included representatives from 16 national scientific societies, but notably not from the Prussian Academy of Sciences, which had declined the invitation. Instead, German delegates from the German Physical Society were present.

The delegates proceeded to appoint a committee that was to create the International Union for Cooperation in Solar Research as a permanent international scientific organization; the new union had its first constituted meeting at Oxford in England a year later. Further meetings were held in Paris in 1907 and at Mount Wilson in 1910, where the purview of the Union was enlarged to include stellar research, in keeping with Hale's emphasis on the Sun as just one among the many other stars. Shortly after the last meeting in Bonn in 1913, World War I broke out, which effectively put an end to the Union's activities. Work continued after the 1919 founding of the International Astronomical Union.

During the war, Hale played a key role in founding the National Research Council to support the government in using science for its policy aims, in particular to further its military ends. In 1922, he was appointed at the League of Nations' Committee on Intellectual Cooperation but had to resign after a few months because of health problems. He was replaced by his colleague Robert Andrew Millikan.

Personal life 
Hale suffered from neurological and psychological problems, including insomnia, frequent headaches, and depression. The often-repeated myth of  schizophrenia, alleging he claimed to have regular visits from an elf who acted as his advisor, arose from a misunderstanding by one of his biographers. He occasionally took time off to spend a few months at a sanatorium in Maine. These problems forced him to resign as director of Mount Wilson. He died at the Las Encinas Sanitarium in Pasadena in 1938.

Honors and awards 
 1894 Janssen Medal from the Paris Academy of Sciences
 1902 Rumford Prize from the American Academy of Arts & Sciences
1902 Elected as a member to the American Philosophical Society
 1904 Henry Draper Medal from the National Academy of Sciences
 1904 Gold Medal of the Royal Astronomical Society
 1916 Catherine Wolfe Bruce Gold Medal from the Astronomical Society of the Pacific
 1917 Prix Jules Janssen from the French Astronomical Society
 1919 Elected an associate of Académie des Sciences, Institut de France
 1920 Galileo Medal from the University of Florence
 1921 Actonian Prize from Royal Institution of London
 1926 Elliott Cresson Medal in Physics from the Franklin Institute of Philadelphia
 1926 Arthur Noble Medal from the City of Pasadena
 1927 Franklin Medal from the Franklin Institute of Philadelphia
 1932 Sir Godfrey Copley Medal from the Royal Society of Great Britain
 1935 Frederic Ives Medal from the Optical Society of America
 Foreign Member of the Royal Society
 Medal of Merit of the Order of Leopold from Belgium
 Order of the Crown of Italy
 Honorary Member of the Vienna Academy of Sciences

Legacy

 100 inch telescope at Mount Wilson Observatory
 Yerkes Observatory, Williams Bay, Wisconsin
 Hale telescope at Palomar Observatory
 22-year solar Hale cycle
 1024 Hale asteroid
 Mount Hale, the 55th highest peak in the Sierra Nevada
 Hale lunar crater
 Hale Martian crater
 George Ellery Hale Middle School, Woodland Hills, California
 Hale House, Shoreland Hall, University of Chicago
 Hale Building, Pasadena, California 
 George Ellery Hale Prize, awarded by the Solar Physics Division of the American Astronomical Society

Popular culture 
Fox Mulder uses the pseudonym "George E. Hale" on several occasions in the TV series The X-Files, most notable in Season 2, Episode 1 "Little Green Men", and Season 2, Episode 4 "Sleepless".

Check It Out! with Dr. Steve Brule has an episode on "space" which references a real fact about Hale in passing.

References 
Notes

Bibliography

External links 

 National Academy of Sciences Biographical Memoir
 George Ellery Hale Papers, Caltech Archives
 
 
 Bruce Medal
 Awarding of the Bruce Medal: PASP 28 (1916) 12
 Awarding of the RAS gold medal: MNRAS 64 (1904) 388
 The Journey to Palomar, 2008 PBS documentary
 Guide to the George Ellery Hale Papers c.1889-1950 at the University of Chicago Special Collections Research Center

1868 births
1938 deaths
American astronomers
American astrophysicists
People from Chicago
Harvard University alumni
American male journalists
Recipients of the Copley Medal
Recipients of the Bruce Medal
California Institute of Technology faculty
Recipients of the Gold Medal of the Royal Astronomical Society
Beloit College faculty
Members of the French Academy of Sciences
Foreign Members of the Royal Society
Journalists from Illinois
American people of English descent
Harvard College Observatory people
The Astrophysical Journal editors
Members of the Royal Society of Sciences in Uppsala